The rufous-breasted antpitta or leymebamba antpitta (Grallaricula leymebambae) is a species of bird in the family Grallariidae. It was first described by American ornithologist and entomologist Melbourne Armstrong Carriker. It is found in Peru and western Bolivia. Its natural habitats are subtropical or tropical moist montane forest and heavily degraded former forest. It has been recently considered a subspecies of Grallaricula ferrugineipectus.

References

rufous-breasted antpitta
rufous-breasted antpitta